Good Morning Heartache is an Italian comedy-drama film of 2008 written by Giovanna Mori and Anna Negri and is directed by the latter. The film is a pseudo-documentary and a low-budget film that was shot in Rome.

Cast
 Alba Rohrwacher as Lucia
 Marco Foschi as Giovanni
 Valentina Lodovini as Michela
 Stefano Fresi as Giorgio
 Alessandro Averone as Eros
 Marina Rocco as Tiziana
 Cristina Odasso as Mara
 Francesca Cutolo as Tosca
 Massimo De Santis as Peppe
 Hossein Taheri as Mario
 Giulia Weber as Sara

Acknowledgments

Sundance Film Festival
The film was featured at the 2008 Sundance Film Festival with the creator of the film Anna Negri.

Awards and nominations
 2008 - Annecy Italian Film Festival
 Best Actress Award: Alba Rohrwacher
 2008 - Nastro d'Argento
 Nominated for Best Actress: Alba Rohrwacher
 2008 - Sulmonacinema Film Festival
 Best Actress: Alba Rohrwacher

References

External links
 
 
 
 
 
 

2008 films
2008 comedy-drama films
2000s Italian-language films
Italian comedy-drama films
Films shot in Rome
2008 comedy films
2008 drama films
Films scored by Dominik Scherrer
2000s Italian films